The Czech Embassy in Washington, D.C. is the Czech Republic's diplomatic mission to the United States. It is located at 3900 Spring of Freedom St., N.W. in Washington, D.C. The embassy also operates Consulates-General in New York City, Los Angeles, and Chicago.

Hynek Kmoníček serves as the current Ambassador.

History

References

External links
wikimapia

Washington
Czech Republic
Czech Republic–United States relations
Czech-American culture in Washington, D.C.
Forest Hills (Washington, D.C.)
Czechoslovakia–United States relations